Maurice Auslander (August 3, 1926 – November 18, 1994) was an American mathematician who worked on commutative algebra, homological algebra and the representation theory of Artin algebras (e.g. finite-dimensional associative algebras over a field). He proved the Auslander–Buchsbaum theorem that regular local rings are factorial, the Auslander–Buchsbaum formula,  and, in collaboration with Idun Reiten, introduced Auslander–Reiten theory and Auslander algebras.

Born in Brooklyn, New York, Auslander received his bachelor's degree and his Ph.D. (1954) from Columbia University. He was a visiting scholar at the Institute for Advanced Study in 1956-57. 
He was a professor at Brandeis University from 1957 until his death in Trondheim, Norway aged 68. He was elected a Fellow of the American Academy of Arts and Sciences in 1971.

Upon his death he was survived by his mother, his widow, a daughter, and a son. His widow Bernice L. Auslander (November 21, 1931 - June 18, 2022) was a professor emerita of mathematics at University of Massachusetts at Boston. As of 2022, his son Philip Auslander is a professor in the School of Literature, Media, and Communication at Georgia Tech, and his daughter Leora Auslander is a professor of history at the University of Chicago. Maurice Auslander's brother Louis Auslander was also a mathematician.

Selected publications

Articles
with David Buchsbaum: Homological dimension in Noetherian rings, Trans. Amer. Math. Soc., vol. 85, 1957, pp. 390–405 
with Oscar Goldman: The Brauer group of a commutative ring, Trans. Amer. Math. Soc., vol. 97, no. 3, 1960, pp. 367–409 
Modules over unramified regular local rings, Illinois J. Math., vol. 5, 1961, pp. 631–647
with Idun Reiten: Representation theory of Artin algebras. III. Almost split sequences, Communications in Algebra, vol. 3, 1975, pp. 239–294 
with Idun Reiten: On a generalized version of the Nakayama conjecture, Proc. Amer. Math. Soc., vol. 52, 1975, pp. 69–74

Books
with Mark Bridger: Stable module theory, American Mathematical Society 1969
with David Buchsbaum: Groups, rings, modules, Harper and Row 1974; 
with Idun Reiten and Sverre O. Smalø: Representation theory of Artin algebras, Cambridge Studies in Advanced Mathematics, 36, Cambridge University Press, 1995

References
Notes

Sources

External links
Maurice Auslander Distinguished Lectures
Maurice Auslander, Mathematician, 68, New York Times obituary

1926 births
1994 deaths
20th-century American mathematicians
Algebraists
Brandeis University faculty
Columbia University alumni
Fellows of the American Academy of Arts and Sciences
Institute for Advanced Study visiting scholars
People from Brooklyn
Mathematicians from New York (state)